Tripoli or Tripolis may refer to:

Places

Greece
Tripolis (region of Arcadia), a district in ancient Arcadia, Greece 
Tripolis (Larisaia), an ancient Greek city in the Pelasgiotis district, Thessaly, near Larissa
Tripolis (Perrhaebia), a district of three cities in ancient Perrhaebia, Thessaly, Greece
Tripolis (region of Laconia), a district in ancient Laconia, Greece
Tripoli, Greece, the capital of Arcadia, Greece

Lebanon
Tripoli, Lebanon, the second largest city in Lebanon
Tripoli District, Lebanon, a district in North Governorate
Tripolis (region of Phoenicia), a maritime district in ancient Phoenicia
County of Tripoli, one of the medieval Crusader states centered in Tripoli, Lebanon
Eyalet of Tripoli, a province of the Ottoman Empire centered in Tripoli, Lebanon
Port of Tripoli (Lebanon)

Libya
Tripoli, Libya, the capital of Libya
Tripoli District, Libya, one of Libya's districts
Tripolitania, a historic region of Libya
Ottoman Tripolitania, frequently described as the "Kingdom of Tripoli"
Tripolis (region of Africa), a district in ancient Tripolitania

Turkey
Tripolis ad Maeandrum, an ancient city In Asia Minor, on the borders of Lydia, Caria and Phrygia
Tripolis (Pontus), an ancient Greek city in the Pontus region of Turkey
Tirebolu, the modern city in Giresun Province, Turkey, taking its name from and located on the site

United States
Tripoli, Iowa, a city in Bremer County, Iowa, United States
Tripoli, Wisconsin, an unincorporated community in Wisconsin, United States
New Tripoli, Pennsylvania, a village in Pennsylvania, United States

People
Leo of Tripoli (early 10th century), a Greek renegade and fleet commander for the Abbasid Caliphate
Melisende of Tripoli (fl. around 1160), daughter of the ruler of the Crusader County of Tripoli, Lebanon
Salvatore Tripoli (1904–1990), American professional boxer and Olympic medalist
Tony Tripoli (born 1969), American actor and LGBT rights activist
Jaman Tripoli (fl. 1998-2005), American soccer player
Pietro Tripoli (born 1987), Italian footballer

Entertainment
Tripoli (film), a 1950 American adventure film
"Tripoli", a song by Matthew Good Band from The Audio of Being
"Tripoli", a song by Pinback from Pinback

Sport
AC Tripoli, an association football club in Tripoli, Lebanon
Al Mouttahed Tripoli, or United Club Tripoli, a sports club in Tripoli, Lebanon
Asteras Tripoli F.C., an association football club in Tripoli, Greece
Tripoli Grand Prix, a car race held between 1925-1940 outside Tripoli, Libya

Other uses
, various US Navy ships
Rotten stone, a polishing agent also known as tripoli

See also
Tripura or Tripuri, Indian form of the Greek word
Siege of Tripoli (disambiguation)
Bombardment of Tripoli (disambiguation)
History of Tripoli (disambiguation)
Raymond of Tripoli (disambiguation)
Tripoli air crash (disambiguation)
Tripoli Airport (disambiguation)
Tripoli Creek (disambiguation)
Tripoli Lake (disambiguation)

Tarablus (disambiguation), Arabic form of the Greek word
Tri-Cities (disambiguation), English equivalent of the Greek word